Horsham is a home rule municipality in Montgomery County, Pennsylvania, United States. The population was 15,193 at the 2020 census. Horsham is located entirely within Horsham Township, and it is home to the Horsham Air Guard Station at the former site of Naval Air Station Joint Reserve Base Willow Grove.

Geography 
Horsham Township covers an area of 17 square miles, 89.70 miles of which are township roads.  There are 23.72 miles of state roads and 1.5 miles of county roads. Horsham Township is made up of several community areas including Horsham (19044) and portions of the Hatboro (19040), Ambler (19002), Chalfont (18914), and North Wales (19454) zip codes.

Climate
The climate in this area is characterized by hot, humid summers and generally cool to cold winters.  According to the Köppen Climate Classification system, Horsham has a humid continental climate, abbreviated "Dfa" on climate maps.

History 
Horsham Township was established in 1717 by Samuel Carpenter, who was from the town of Horsham in Sussex, England. The Township, incorporated in 1717, is one of the oldest original municipalities in Montgomery County. Although it retains the word "Township" in its official name, it has been governed by a Home Rule Charter since 1975 and is therefore not subject to the Pennsylvania Township Code.

Horsham Township is named after the town of Horsham in West Sussex County, England. Horsham is one of several townships in Montgomery County whose name and size were determined by master survey lines drawn by William Penn's engineers as they first plotted this part of the colony for sale and settlement. Parallel lines, projected at intervals of a mile and a half and extending in a northwesterly direction from settlements along the Delaware, served not only as base lines for measurement of individual land grants but also as courses for future highways. County Line Road, Horsham Road, and Welsh Road are examples of highways thus laid out. The effect of these survey lines upon the development pattern of Eastern Montgomery County is very much in evidence today.

Demographics 

As of the 2010 census, the CDP was 84.4% Non-Hispanic White, 4.7% Black or African American, 0.2% Native American and Alaskan Native, 5.8% Asian, 0.1% Native Hawaiian and Other Pacific Islander, 1.2% were Some Other Race, and 1.6% were two or more races. 3.5% of the population were of Hispanic or Latino ancestry.

As of the census of 2000, there were 14,779 people, 5,798 households, and 3,907 families residing in the CDP. The population density was 2,704.6 people per square mile (1,045.1/km2). There were 5,917 housing units at an average density of 1,082.8/sq mi (418.4/km2). The racial makeup of the CDP was 90.10% White, 3.79% African American, 0.19% Native American, 4.34% Asian, 0.60% from other races, and 0.98% from two or more races. Hispanic or Latino of any race were 1.45% of the population.

There were 5,798 households, out of which 33.5% had children under the age of 18 living with them, 54.5% were married couples living together, 9.6% had a female householder with no husband present, and 32.6% were non-families. 26.5% of all households were made up of individuals, and 6.3% had someone living alone who was 65 years of age or older. The average household size was 2.54 and the average family size was 3.12.

In the CDP, the population was spread out, with 25.3% under the age of 18, 6.7% from 18 to 24, 35.6% from 25 to 44, 21.5% from 45 to 64, and 10.9% who were 65 years of age or older. The median age was 36 years. For every 100 females, there were 96.2 males. For every 100 females age 18 and over, there were 93.9 males.

The median income for a household in the CDP was $56,500, and the median income for a family was $68,619. Males had a median income of $43,177 versus $32,464 for females. The per capita income for the CDP was $25,116. About 1.7% of families and 3.1% of the population were below the poverty line, including 2.9% of those under age 18 and 2.9% of those age 65 or over.

Economy 

Companies located in Horsham:
Arris Group, telecommunications equipment manufacturer
Ball Corporation, aerosol can manufacturer
Benjamin Obdyke Incorporated, building materials manufacturer
Bimbo Bakeries USA, corporate headquarters
Janssen, a Johnson & Johnson subsidiary 
NCO Group, Inc., business process outsourcing company
Nutrisystem, corporate headquarters
Penn Mutual, life insurance company
Toll Brothers, corporate headquarters
Music Choice, cable music company
NextGen, software company
Walmart, northeast headquarters
Zenescope Entertainment, comic and Graphic novel publisher

Education 
Schools in Horsham are part of the Hatboro-Horsham School District. 

There is an area Catholic grade school, Our Lady of Mercy Regional Catholic School, in Maple Glen. Our Lady of Mercy was formed in 2012 by the merger of St. Catherine of Siena in Horsham, and St. Anthony-St. Joseph in Ambler, St. Alphonsus in Maple Glen.

The public middle school is Keith Valley Middle School and the public high school is Hatboro-Horsham Senior High School.

The four public elementary schools include Blair Mill Elementary School, Crooked Billet Elementary School, Hallowell Elementary School, and Dorothea H. Simmons Elementary School.

Transportation
Major roads in Horsham include Pennsylvania Route 611, which runs north–south through the community along Easton Road; Horsham Road, which heads northwest–southeast through the community and is designated as Pennsylvania Route 463 west of Pennsylvania Route 611; Pennsylvania Route 63, which runs northwest–southeast along the southwestern edge of Horsham on Welsh Road; County Line Road, which runs northwest–southeast along the border with Bucks County at the northeastern edge of the community; Blair Mill Road, which runs southwest–northeast along the southeastern edge of Horsham; Dresher Road, which runs southwest–northeast between Welsh Road and Pennsylvania Route 611; Meetinghouse Road, which runs southwest–northeast from Pennsylvania Route 611 at Dresher Road to County Line Road; and Norristown Road, which heads west from Horsham Road towards Maple Glen. The Willow Grove Interchange of the Pennsylvania Turnpike is located to the south in neighboring Upper Moreland Township, connecting to Pennsylvania Route 611.

SEPTA provides bus service in Horsham. The Route 55 bus follows Pennsylvania Route 611 through the community and heads north to Doylestown and south to Willow Grove and Olney Transportation Center in North Philadelphia. Three additional bus routes serve the business parks in Horsham. The Route 80 bus runs a limited-stop express route between Horsham and the Olney Transportation Center. The Route 310 bus, known as the Horsham Breeze Red, and the Route 311 bus, known as the Horsham Breeze Blue, connect the Horsham business parks to the Willow Grove Park Mall and the Willow Grove station along SEPTA Regional Rail's Warminster Line.

Sport 
Ukrainian American Sports Centre – Tryzub.
Horsham Soccer Club
Horsham Hawks
Horsham Hounds: a Suburban baseball team, home games are played at Deep Meadow Park
HHoops Basketball

References 

Census-designated places in Montgomery County, Pennsylvania
Census-designated places in Pennsylvania